The University of Lima is a private nonprofit university in Lima, Peru. 

It was founded in 1962 and it is considered one of the most prestigious and remembered universities in Peru. The decision to create the University of Lima was made in the early 1960s by a group of university professors, along with commerce and industry representatives gathered in the Civil Association PRODIES (Promotion of Industrial Development through Higher Education). It was after two years of effort that they managed to start it. It officially started operating on 25 April 1962. At the beginning only had with 120 students in a small campus in the Jesús María District. Due to the university's quick growth, the campus in the Monterrico area of Surco was inaugurated to serve the university's space needs.

Today, the University of Lima has over 20,000 students, 13 majors, a postgraduate school, a general studies program and a scientific research institute, international relations, along with many services for students, faculty, and the community at large.

Notable alumni 
 Mario Bellatin (born 1960), Mexican novelist
 Liz Benavides (born 1969), lawyer, Peru's attorney general
 Carlos Bruce de Oca (born 1957), politician
 Enrique Javier Cornejo Ramirez, politician
 Mávila Huertas (born 1970), journalist, writer, actress, and radio and television presenter
 Alex Kouri (born 1964), lawyer and politician
 Daniel Mora (born 1945), military officer and politician
 Ricardo Morán Vargas (born 1974), communicator, producer and director
 Beto Ortiz (born 1968), journalist and writer
 Alessandra de Osma (born 1988), wife of Christian of Hannover
 Milena Warthon (born 2000), singer-songwriter

References

External links 

 

 
Universities in Lima
Educational institutions established in 1962
1962 establishments in Peru